In the mathematical theory of probability, the combinants cn of a random variable X are defined via the combinant-generating function G(t), which is defined from the moment generating function M(z) as

which can be expressed directly in terms of a random variable X as 

wherever this expectation exists.

The nth combinant can be obtained as the nth derivatives of the logarithm of combinant generating function evaluated at –1 divided by n factorial:

Important features in common with the cumulants are:
 the combinants share the additivity property of the cumulants;
 for infinite divisibility (probability) distributions, both sets of moments are strictly positive.

References

   Google Books

Theory of probability distributions